The following are the scheduled events, results and champions of association football for the year 2011 throughout the Union of European Football Associations.

Scheduled events

Men's football 
 3–15 May — 2011 UEFA European Under-17 Football Championship in Serbia
 12 – 25 June — 2011 UEFA European Under-21 Football Championship in Denmark
 20 July – 1 August — 2011 UEFA European Under-19 Football Championship in Romania

Women's football 
 2 – 9 March — 2011 Algarve Cup in Portugal
  
  
  
 4th:

Headlines 
 31 January: The 4th highest transfer fee in football history (£49.5m) was recorded, when Fernando Torres signed for Chelsea F.C. from Liverpool F.C. Andy Carroll's same-day move from Newcastle United to Liverpool for £35m was the eighth highest fee received for a player.
 5 May: Skënderbeu win the 2010–11 Albanian Superliga championship, making it the first time since 1933 that the club has won the top division of Albanian football.
 18 May: Held in Dublin, the 2011 UEFA Europa League Final was an all Portuguese affair, with Porto defeating Braga in the final. Porto earned a berth into the 2011 UEFA Super Cup.
 28 May: Barcelona of Spain defeat Manchester United of England 3–1 in the 2011 UEFA Champions League Final. Barcelona was rewarded with an automatic berth into the 2011 FIFA Club World Cup, 2011 UEFA Super Cup and next year's Champions League.
 26 August: Barcelona defeats Porto 2–0 at Stade Louis II in Monaco to win the 2011 UEFA Super Cup.

International football

Men's events 

Most notably, 2011 consisted of all men's UEFA teams competing in qualification for UEFA Euro 2012. As tournament hosts, both Poland and Ukraine earned direct qualification into Group Stage.

The qualification season ended on 11 October 2011, with group winners earning berths into Euro 2012. For group runners-up, the highest ranked second team qualified automatically for the tournament, while the remainder entered the play-offs. As some groups contain six teams and some five, matches against the sixth-placed team in each group were not included in this ranking. As a result, a total of eight matches played by each team count toward the purpose of the second-placed ranking table.

The teams, other than the hosts, to qualify for the tournament included: Croatia, Czech Republic, Denmark, England, France, Germany, Greece, Italy, the Netherlands, Portugal, Republic of Ireland, Russia, Spain and Sweden.

Women's events 

The German Football Association hosted the 2011 FIFA Women's World Cup, making it the first time since 1995 a European nation hosted the FIFA Women's World Cup. While the German nation team was eliminated in the quarterfinals, two UEFA nations, namely Sweden and France reached the semifinals of the World Cup. Both teams lost, however, to Japan and the United States, respectively. Goals from Sweden's Lotta Schelin and Marie Hammarström gave the Swedes a 2–1 victory over France in the consolation match.

Considered the second largest international women's football tournament, the Portugal's 2011 edition of the Algarve Cup took place. While the final was not won by a European side, Iceland reached the final match before losing to the United States. Sweden reached the consolation match, but lost to Japan.

Club football

Continental champions

Men's football

Champions League 

Barcelona of Spain's La Liga won the 2010–11 edition of the UEFA Champions League, making it the fourth time the club won either the Champions League or European Cup. Barcelona defeated Manchester United of England's Premier League in the championship. The final was played at Wembley Stadium in London, making it the first time since renovations that the venue hosted the Champions League final.

The entire knockout round of the tournament was played in 2011, beginning with sixteen clubs from seven different UEFA nations. The five largest leagues by UEFA coefficients had at least two representatives in the knockout phase of the tournament. Outside of the "big five", Denmark's Copenhagen and Ukraine's Shakhtar Donetsk earned berths into the knockout round, with Shakhtar Dontsk reaching the quarterfinals, before losing to eventual champions, Barcelona.

Lionel Messi of Barcelona was the tournament's top-scorer scoring twelve goals in thirteen appearances.

Bracket

Europa League

Women's football

Champions League 

In the tenth edition of the UEFA Women's Champions League, France's Lyon won their first ever title, defeating Germany's Turbine Potsdam in the final. The final, like the Men's Champions League, was also played at London, but at the Craven Cottage.

Bracket

Domestic league champions

Men's football

Women's football

Domestic Cup Champions

Men's Football

Footnotes 

A  Including the Yugoslav First League, Dinamo Zagreb has won a total of 19 top division domestic football championships.
B  Includes Manchester United's First Division (pre-1992) and Premier League (since 1992) championships.
C  Includes Maccabi Haifa's Israel First Division and Premier League championships.
D  Includes FK Ekranas' Soviet Lithuania league championship along with their A Lyga titles.
E  The Russian Premier League is switching to the FIFA calendar and a 2011–12 calendar. The previous season was 2010, and there will be no champion crowned in 2011.

References